The following is a list of municipal presidents of the city of Guadalajara, in Jalisco state, Mexico.

See also
 Timeline of Guadalajara

References

 
Guadalajara